Space Age Playboys was a band formed by Johnny Jetson and former Warrior Soul lead singer Kory Clarke, named after that band's final album before their 1995 break up. Based in Los Angeles, the band was active from 1997 to 2000, releasing one studio and one live album, touring Europe twice and the US once. Following from the name given Warrior Soul's style since their album Chill Pill, the band was referred to as an "acid punk" band, but critics also noted a shift in lyrical focus from Clarke's earlier, darker, more political work to a focus on party anthems and drugs.

Members

 Kory Clarke – vocals
 Johnny Jetson – guitar
 Stevie Deluxe – drums
 Riley Baxter – bass

Discography 

 New Rock Underground (1999)
 Live in London (1999)

References

External links
 Discography & bio at Discogs.com
 Discography & bio at AllMusic.com

1997 establishments in California
Heavy metal musical groups from California
Musical groups established in 1997